Julia Harting (née Fischer; born 1 April 1990 in Berlin) is a German athlete who specialises in the discus throw.  She won the silver medal at the 2016 European Championships, and has represented Germany at two Olympics (2012 and 2016).

She was a u18 World Champion in 2007.

Fischer represented Germany at the 2012 European Athletics Championships where she finished 5th in the discus event with a throw of 62.10 metres.  She also finished in 5th at the 2015 World Championships.

Julia Harting is married to German discus thrower Robert Harting.

International competitions

References

External links 
 

1990 births
Living people
Athletes from Berlin
German female discus throwers
Olympic athletes of Germany
Athletes (track and field) at the 2012 Summer Olympics
Athletes (track and field) at the 2016 Summer Olympics
World Athletics Championships athletes for Germany
European Athletics Championships medalists